Virgil William Luken (born September 12, 1942) is an American former competition swimmer.

Luken represented the United States at the 1964 Summer Olympics in Tokyo, Japan.  He swam for the breaststroke leg for the gold medal-winning U.S. team in the qualifying heats of the men's 4×100-meter medley relay.  He did not receive a medal, however.  Under the 1964 swimming rules, he was ineligible to receive a medal because he swam in the preliminary heats and not the event final.

Luken attended the University of Minnesota, where he swam for the Minnesota Golden Gophers swimming and diving team in National Collegiate Athletic Association (NCAA) competition from 1962 to 1964.

See also
 List of University of Minnesota people

References

External links
  Virgil Luken – Olympic athlete profile at Sports-Reference.com

1942 births
Living people
American male breaststroke swimmers
Minnesota Golden Gophers men's swimmers
Olympic swimmers of the United States
Sportspeople from Minneapolis
Swimmers at the 1964 Summer Olympics